Rhytiphora cruciata is a species of beetle in the family Cerambycidae. It was described by Francis Polkinghorne Pascoe in 1875, originally under the genus Corrhenes. It is known from Australia.

References

cruciata
Beetles described in 1875